11885 Summanus is a dark asteroid and large near-Earth object of the Apollo group. It was discovered by astronomers with the Spacewatch programm at Kitt Peak Observatory on 25 September 1990. It was named after Summanus, the Roman deity of nocturnal lightning and thunder.

Discovery and naming 

Summanus was discovered on 25 September 1990, by Spacewatch survey at the Kitt Peak Observatory, southwest of Tucson, Arizona, United States. It was the first fully automatic discovery of a near-Earth asteroid. The name Summanus is symbolic of the discovery of the asteroid by software running on a (lightning-fast) computer.

Orbit 

The orbit is well-established with over 20 years of observations. Summanus orbits the Sun in the inner main-belt at a distance of 0.9–2.5 AU once every 2 years and 3 months (812 days). Its orbit has an eccentricity of 0.47 and an inclination of 19° with respect to the ecliptic.

References

External links 
 Asteroid Lightcurve Database (LCDB), query form (info )
 Dictionary of Minor Planet Names, Google books
 Asteroids and comets rotation curves, CdR – Observatoire de Genève, Raoul Behrend
 
 
 

011885
011885
Named minor planets
19900925